The Charlemagne Prize (full name originally Internationaler Karlspreis der Stadt Aachen, International Charlemagne Prize of the City of Aachen, since 1988 Internationaler Karlspreis zu Aachen, International Charlemagne Prize at Aachen) is a prize awarded for work done in the service of European unification. It has been awarded since 1950 by the German city of Aachen. It commemorates Charlemagne, ruler of the Frankish Empire and founder of what became the Holy Roman Empire, who resided and is buried in Aachen. Traditionally the award is given to the recipient on Ascension Day in a ceremony in the Aachen Town Hall. In April 2008, the organisers of the Charlemagne Prize and the European Parliament jointly created a new European Charlemagne Youth Prize, which recognises contributions by young people towards the process of European integration. Patrons of the foundation are King Philippe of Belgium, King Felipe VI of Spain, and Henri, the Grand Duke of Luxembourg.

History 

On 19 December 1949,  presented to the reading group "Corona Legentium Aquensis", which he had founded, his proposals for the prize: "We have the honour of proposing annual presentation of an international prize for the most valuable contribution in the services of Western European understanding and work for the community, and in the services of humanity and world peace. This contribution may be in the field of literary, scientific, economic or political endeavour."

The sponsors of the prize, the City of Aachen, refer to Charlemagne as the "Founder of Western Culture", and assert that under his reign, the City of Aachen was once the spiritual and political centre of the whole of what is now western Europe.

The first Charlemagne Prize was awarded to Richard von Coudenhove-Kalergi, the founder of the Pan-European Movement.

Following the presentation of the award to the Italian Prime Minister Alcide de Gasperi in 1952, the International Charlemagne Prize of the City of Aachen has repeatedly sent messages going far beyond Germany and promoting the "unity of Europe".

The award sponsors assert that the list of Charlemagne Prize winners reflects the history of the European process of unification, commonly referred to as European Integration. They continue that it has been awarded to founding fathers of a United Europe such as de Gasperi, Schuman, Monnet and Adenauer, and to those who have embodied hope for integration such as Edward Heath, Konstantinos Karamanlis, and His Majesty Juan Carlos I.

The sponsors promote that the Charlemagne Prize is not only an expression of gratitude for lasting services for the unity of Europe, but also an encouragement and an expression of hopes and expectations directed towards the future. They quote Kurt Pfeiffer: "the Charlemagne Prize reaches into the future, and at the same time it embodies an obligation – an obligation of the highest ethical value. It is directed at a voluntary union of the European peoples without constraint, so that in their newfound strength they may defend the highest earthly goods – freedom, humanity and peace – and safeguard the future of their children and children's children."

In April 2008, the organisers of the Charlemagne Prize and the European Parliament jointly created a new European Charlemagne Youth Prize, which recognises contributions by young people towards the process of European integration.

Recipients 

 1950  Richard von Coudenhove-Kalergi
 1951  Hendrik Brugmans
 1952  Alcide de Gasperi
 1953  Jean Monnet
 1954  Konrad Adenauer
 1956  Winston Churchill
 1957  Paul Henri Spaak
 1958  Robert Schuman
 1959  George C. Marshall
 1960  Joseph Bech
 1961  Walter Hallstein
 1963  Edward Heath
 1964  Antonio Segni
 1966  Jens Otto Krag
 1967  Joseph Luns
 1969  European Commission
 1970  François Seydoux de Clausonne
 1972  Roy Jenkins
 1973  Salvador de Madariaga
 1976  Leo Tindemans
 1977  Walter Scheel
 1978  Konstantinos Karamanlis
 1979  Emilio Colombo
 1981  Simone Veil
 1982  Juan Carlos of Spain
 1984  Karl Carstens
 1986  The People of Luxembourg
 1987  Henry Kissinger
 1988  Helmut Kohl and  François Mitterrand
 1989  Frère Roger
 1990  Gyula Horn
 1991  Václav Havel
 1992  Jacques Delors
 1993  Felipe González
 1994  Gro Harlem Brundtland
 1995  Franz Vranitzky
 1996  Beatrix of the Netherlands
 1997  Roman Herzog
 1998  Bronisław Geremek
 1999  Tony Blair
 2000  Bill Clinton
 2001  György Konrád
 2002  The Euro
 2003  Valéry Giscard d'Estaing
 2004  Pat Cox
 2004  /  Pope John Paul II (extraordinary prize)
 2005  Carlo Azeglio Ciampi
 2006  Jean-Claude Juncker
 2007  Javier Solana
 2008  Angela Merkel
 2009  Andrea Riccardi
 2010  Donald Tusk
 2011  Jean-Claude Trichet
 2012  Wolfgang Schäuble
 2013  Dalia Grybauskaitė
 2014  Herman Van Rompuy
 2015  Martin Schulz
 2016  /  Pope Francis
 2017  Timothy Garton Ash
 2018  Emmanuel Macron
 2019  António Guterres
 2020/2021  Klaus Iohannis
 2022  Sviatlana Tsikhanouskaya, Maria Kalesnikava, Veronika Tsepkalo
 2023  Volodymyr Zelenskyy and the Ukrainian people

By country 
  Germany,  France : 9
  Italy,  United Kingdom : 5
  Spain : 4
  Belgium,  United States,  Netherlands,  Luxembourg : 3
  Vatican,  Hungary,  Austria,  Poland,  Europe : 2
  Ireland,  Czech Republic,  Norway,  Lithuania,  Denmark,  Greece,  Switzerland,  Portugal,  Romania,  Belarus,  Ukraine :1
(The popes are counted only for the Vatican City)

See also 
 European Charlemagne Youth Prize
 European integration
 Leipzig Human Rights Award, originally called the "Alternative Charlemagne Award", formed in opposition to Clinton's recognition with the award
 The Writing on the Wall (Yes Minister), which subjects the prize to satirical treatment (called the 'Napoleon Prize' in the episode)
 , formed in opposition to Kissinger's recognition with the award

References

External links 

 
 
 
 

Humanitarian and service awards
Awards established in 1949
German awards
European awards
Aachen
European integration
Municipal awards